Pyala Lake is a round lake in Jalkhand, Kaghan Valley, Mansehra District of Khyber Pakhtunkhwa.

See also
Payala Lake Ghazi Ghat
Ansu Lake
Lulusar Lake
Kaghan Valley

References

Pyala Lake
Tourist attractions in Khyber Pakhtunkhwa
Mansehra District